Ankur Arora Murder Case is a 2013 Indian Hindi medical thriller film directed by Suhail Tatari and written and produced by Vikram Bhatt. The film stars Arjun Mathur, Tisca Chopra, Kay Kay Menon, Paoli Dam. The film takes up an urgent and disturbing issue of death during surgery and is based on a real-life incident where a boy dies on the  operation table due to medical negligence. The shooting of the film started after nearly one year of research and similarities to real life are in this case, not coincidental.
The movie released on 14 June 2013 and made a profit of 2.5 Crores approximately. It was declared semi hit.

Plot
Dr. Romesh Sharma is a young medical intern who dares to dream. He is in awe of Dr. Viren. Asthana, the Chief Surgeon of the Shekhawat General Hospital. All he wants is to be like him. He lives with Dr. Riya Srivastava, his co-intern and the love of his life.

However, when an eight-year-old boy, Ankur Arora (Vishesh Tiwari) dies due to Dr. Asthana's medical negligence, Romesh realises that a good surgeon is not necessarily a good person.

Together with Ankur's mother Nandita Arora, Nandita's friend Ajay Shetty, their lawyer Kajori Sen, Dr. Romesh sets out on a turbulent journey to fight for what is right. A fight for justice against his mentor, the hospital and the love of his life who is initially against him for the fear of ruining her career and future. It is revealed that Kajori is in a relationship with her opposing lawyer who tells her to keep the case hanging and only blame the hospital overall, not Dr Asthana specifically. She does the same in the court but soon finds that she is pregnant with his child. As she informs him, he orders her to abort the baby. Romesh spots them together and with Nandita he goes to her house, only to find her lying ill due the abortion pill. They take her to the hospital and she promises them that she will fight for Ankur. Turns out, that all the necessary evidence against Dr. Viren Asthana is destroyed or literally snatched. Dr. Riya, who witnesses the operation, and Rosina D'Costa (Khushboo Kamal), a ward nurse in the hospital who had informed Dr. Asthana about Ankur eating some biscuits before the operation, also lie in court. The next day Riya goes to Dr Viren Asthana to sign for leave, she tells him that she lied, cheated with the credibility of her profession and her self respect is questioning her. A heated argument between her and Dr Asthana follows in which Dr asthana labels himself to be the god who should be forgiven for the mistake he has done. It is revealed in the hospital the next day that Riya had actually Shot the confession outburst by Dr. Viren Asthana on her mobile and presented it to the court. The case ends upon their favour and Dr Viren Asthana gets arrested. In the last scene, Romesh and Riya reunite and Nandita is shown remembering her memories with Ankur.

Cast

 Tisca Chopra as Nandita Arora, Ankur's mother
 Arjun Mathur as Dr. Romesh Sharma
 Kay Kay Menon as Dr. Viren. Asthana
 Vishakha Singh as Dr. Riya Srivastava
 Harsh Chhaya as Shekhawat Awasthi, Owner of the hospital
 Paoli Dam as Advocate Kajori Sen, Nandita's lawyer
 Sachin Khurana as Ajay Shetty, employer and Nandita's friend
 Manish Choudhary as Advocate Rajiv Mallani, Shekhawat & Dr. Asthana's lawyer
 Kanchan Awasthi as Dr. Hiya Shah
 Vishesh Tiwari as Ankur Arora, Nandita's son
 Khushboo Kamal as Rosina D'Costa
 Krunal Pandit
 Abhay Bhargava
 Vikram Kumar Vij
 Pankaj Thakur
 Praveen Pachpore
 Anumita
 Deepak Dhawal

Production
The production of the film began in September 2012, the initial thought was to shoot the film in the same hospital in Delhi where the case happened.

Soundtrack

Track listing
The lyrics are penned by Sagar Lahauri

Critical reception

The movie received mixed reviews. Subhash K. Jha gave the movie 4 stars and said, "Indeed The Ankur Arora Murder Case is a far cleverer, wiser and relevant film than most of what we get to see these days. Bursting at the seams with acting talent director Suhail Tatari's restorative drama hits us where it hurts the most. The conscience." Meena Iyer of Times of India gave it 3.5 stars. "Tatari is a winner in his choice of a subject. The story that has been researched from a true life incident does provide meaningful insights about the medical fraternity and facilities. However while the film is an eye-opener on medical skullduggery, it fails to become cutting edge cinema because the screenplay-offers few surprises." said ToI. Shubhra Gupta of Indian Express said "Pity because this could have been a medico-legal thriller with teeth." and gave it 2 star. Tushar Joshi of Daily News and Analysis gave it 2 stars. "The film engages you in the beginning but loses steam because of a its weak execution." wrote Tushar Joshi. NDTV Movies gave it a rating of 2.5. Taran Adarsh of Bollywood Hungama gave it 3 stars.

References

External links
 

2013 films
Indian thriller films
2013 thriller films